The 2013 Windward Islands Tournament is an international football tournament which will take place in St. Vincent between 21 April and 29 April 2013. 

Players marked (c) were named as captain for their national squad.

Dominica

Coach:  Kurt Hector

Grenada

Coach:  Clark John

Saint Lucia

Coach:  Francis Lastic

Saint Vincent and the Grenadines

Coach:  Cornelius Huggins

References

Windward Islands Tournament squads